Caroline at Midnight is a 1993 erotic thriller film, written by Travis Rink and directed by Scott McGinnis. Rated R, it was released direct-to-video in December 1993. It aired on Cinemax in 1994 and the Showtime Network in 1995. In 1995 it was screened on The Movie Channel's Joe Bob's Drive-in Theater with producer Roger Corman discussing the making of the film with film critic Joe Bob Briggs. In reflecting on her career in a 2009 interview in the Los Angeles Times, Virginia Madsen described her role in this film as indicative of the low quality sex driven films which she was type cast in during the 1990s.

Plot 
Victoria is a dealer. She is playing a dangerous game. She is playing into the hands of her husband and his partner, who are dirty cops. Victoria is falling in love with a reporter, who knows all of their secrets.

Cast 

Clayton Rohner as Jack Lynch
Mia Sara as Victoria Dillon
Tim Daly as Ray
Paul Le Mat as Emmet
Judd Nelson as Phil Gallo
Xander Berkeley as Joey Szabo
Virginia Madsen as Susan Prince
Caroline Barclay as Caroline
Stacey Travis as Christine Jenkins
Hawthorne James as Stan Donovan
Lewis Van Bergen as Prince's Bodyguard
Ben Meyerson as Miguel
Zach Galligan as Jerry Hiatt
Thomas F. Wilson as Officer Keaton
George Wilkerson as Capt. Jacobs
Jay Baker as Policeman
Greg Collins as Bartender
Daniel Bardol as News Room Producer
Doug Wert as Detective Martin
Julie Bick as Detective #1
Kirk Baily as Detective #2
Susan Harvey as Lili
Christina Karras as Party Dancer
Bobbe Renshaw as Waitress
Julie Baltay as Dream Love
Natalie Alexander as Party girl (uncredited)

References

External links 

1993 films
1993 romance films
1993 thriller films
American erotic thriller films
1990s Spanish-language films
Films scored by Mark Snow
Films about infidelity
Films produced by Roger Corman
1990s romantic thriller films
1990s buddy cop films
1990s English-language films
1990s American films